Namsos Airport, referred locally as Høknesøra Airport, is a regional airport located along the Namsen river, just outside the town of Namsos in Trøndelag county, Norway. The airport is served with Dash 8 aircraft from Widerøe on public service obligation contracts with the Ministry of Transport and Communications. It had 25,684 passengers in 2011 and is owned and operated by Avinor. There has been one large disaster associated with the airport. In 1993, Widerøe Flight 744 hit ground in darkness during approach, causing six deaths out of 19 on board.

Airlines and destinations

Statistics

References

Airports in Trøndelag
Avinor airports
Namsos
1968 establishments in Norway
Airports established in 1968